All Through the Night is a 1942 American comedy-gangster-spy thriller film directed by Vincent Sherman and starring Humphrey Bogart, Conrad Veidt and Kaaren Verne, and featuring many of the Warner Bros. company of character actors. It was released by Warner Brothers. The supporting cast features Peter Lorre, Frank McHugh, Jackie Gleason, Phil Silvers, Barton MacLane, and William Demarest.

Plot
Alfred "Gloves" Donahue, a big-shot Broadway gambler, is alerted by his mother, "Ma" Donahue, that her neighbor, Mr. Miller, a baker who makes Gloves' favorite cheesecake, is missing and she's "got a feeling" something sinister has happened. Gloves searches the bakery and finds Miller's dead body.  A young singer, Leda Hamilton, quickly leaves the shop upon hearing about Miller's demise. Mrs. Donahue believes that the girl knows something and tracks her down to a night club, where she creates a racket by "crabbing" about Miller's death. Marty Callahan, co-owner of the club, calls Gloves, insisting that he come down and take care of the situation. While at the club, Gloves has a drink with Leda that is interrupted by her piano player, Pepi, who takes her away to a back room, where he shoots Marty's partner, Joe Denning. Leda and Pepi then disappear in a taxi as Gloves stumbles upon Joe. Before dying, Joe raises up five fingers to indicate who took Leda. Gloves quickly leaves to search for Leda, inadvertently leaving one of his gloves at the murder scene.

While being suspected of Joe's murder by Marty and the police, Gloves traces the taxi to an antiques auction house operated by Hall Ebbing and his assistant, Madame. Gloves poses as a bidder but is recognized by Pepi. He subsequently gets knocked out by Leda, tied up, and left in a storage room with one of his boys, Sunshine, who was captured earlier. Later, Leda visits them and helps them break free before they can be shipped out in crates. While escaping, Gloves and Sunshine walk into a room with maps, charts, a short-wave radio, and a portrait of Adolf Hitler. They realize what Joe was indicating before he died: their captors are "fivers" or Nazi fifth columnists. Gloves finds a notebook and reads Miller's name in it as well as that of "Leda Hamilton", her Jewish name "Uda Hammel", and the death of her father in Dachau concentration camp.

With Leda in tow, they escape. They are chased by Ebbing and his cronies into Central Park. Here, Leda explains that she works with Ebbing only to save her father's life. While Gloves fights with a Nazi, Leda reads the torn-out page that states her father is already dead. Gloves and Leda go to the police, who search the antique house, but find it empty. Not believing Gloves's story, they attempt to arrest him, but he escapes by diving into the East River. He arrives at his lawyer's apartment, only to have Marty and his mob break in, eager to avenge Joe's murder. After Gloves convinces them of his innocence, the two gangs join forces against the Nazi spies.

Gloves, Sunshine, and Barney go to the police station where Leda is being held. Ebbing, however, has bailed her out, and they arrive as she is being forced into a car. Following the car, they find a large underground Nazi meeting. Gloves and Sunshine capture two Nazis and impersonate them to get in, but the explosives expert Gloves is impersonating is asked to report on his work. Gloves and Sunshine stall the meeting using a double talk ruse until the combined gangs arrive to break it up. Ebbing escapes, asking Pepi to join him in a suicide attack to blow up a battleship in New York harbor. Pepi refuses, so Ebbing kills him and proceeds alone. Gloves follows him to the docks, but Ebbing surprises him and forces him into a motorboat containing high explosives. At gunpoint, Ebbing forces Gloves to steer the boat toward the battleship. Gloves suddenly steers the boat off course and jumps into the water, while the boat with Ebbing still on board crashes into a barge and explodes.

Back at the police station, Gloves and Leda find out that all charges have been dropped and that the mayor is going to honor him at city hall. Ma Donahue enters complaining that the milkman has disappeared, and as before, she's "got a feeling" about it.

Cast

 Humphrey Bogart as Alfred "Gloves" Donahue
 Conrad Veidt as Hall Ebbing
 Kaaren Verne as Leda Hamilton
 Jane Darwell as Mrs. 'Ma' Donahue
 Frank McHugh as Barney
 Peter Lorre as Pepi
 Judith Anderson as Madame
 William Demarest as Sunshine
 Jackie Gleason as Starchy
 Phil Silvers as Waiter
 Wallace Ford as Spats Hunter, Gloves' lawyer 
 Barton MacLane as Marty Callahan
 Edward Brophy as Joe Denning
 Martin Kosleck as Steindorff
 Jean Ames as Annabelle
 Ludwig Stössel as Mr. Herman Miller
 Irene Seidner as Mrs. Miller
 James Burke as Lieutenant Forbes
 Ben Welden as Smitty
 Hans Schumm as Anton
 Charles Cane as Sage
 Frank Sully as Spence
 Sam McDaniel as Saratoga
 Eddy Chandler as Police Sergeant (uncredited)
 Louis V. Arco as Short-Wave Radio Man (uncredited)
 Emory Parnell as Cop Outside Warehouse (uncredited)
 Henry Victor as Meeting Receptionist (uncredited)

Cast notes
 Jackie Gleason and Wallace Ford are billed onscreen as "Jackie C. Gleason" and "Wally Ford" respectively.
 Jackie Gleason and Phil Silvers owe their presence in the film to the direct intervention of Warner Bros. studio head Jack L. Warner, who personally phoned Sherman to put them in the picture because he didn't want to keep paying them to "sit around and do nothing." Since the film was already well into shooting, both actors appear in the opening scene, then are little seen until the climax.
 Kaaren Verne and Peter Lorre married in 1945, and divorced in 1950.

Production
Production was completed in early October 1941, two months before the attack on Pearl Harbor. The film was released in New York on January 23, 1942.

Producer Hal B. Wallis made All Through the Night as a "companion piece" to his earlier anti-Nazi melodrama, Underground, despite the poor box office of the prior film.

Humphrey Bogart was not the first person considered for the lead in the film: it was originally supposed to be played by Walter Winchell, the gossip columnist who would later be the narrator for the TV series The Untouchables. When Winchell could not get the time off to make the film, Wallis offered it to George Raft, and then, when Raft turned it down, to Bogart. It was one of several parts Bogart played which had originally been offered to Raft.

Olivia de Havilland and Marlene Dietrich were considered for the female lead.

On TCM.com, Mark Frankel reports that the scene in which Bogart and William Demarest confuse a room full of Nazi sympathizers with doubletalk was not part of the original script,  “Sherman thought the idea up himself and presented it to producer Hal Wallis. Wallis hated the idea, but Sherman was so convinced that the film needed it, that he shot it anyway. When Wallis saw the scene in the rough cut, he angrily told Sherman to take it out. Sherman, however, left a bit of it in and when the film had a sneak preview, the audience ‘exploded with laughter' at the double-talk. Wallis told Sherman to put it all back in.”

Reception
Review aggregator Rotten Tomatoes gives the film a 100% rating based on ten contemporary reviews, with an average rating of 7.5/10.

Leonard Maltin gives it 3 out of 4 stars: "Interesting blend of spy, gangster, and comedy genres, with memorable double-talk and auction scenes."

Bosley Crowther of The New York Times gave the film a mostly positive review, writing: "In spite of its slap-bang construction and its hour-and-three-quarters length, the picture does move with precision and steadily maintained suspense ... All Through the Night is not exactly a melodrama out of the top drawer, but it is a super-duper action picture — mostly duper, when you stop to think."

On Dec. 3, 1941, before the attack on Pearl Harbor, a reviewer for Variety wrote: "Somewhat on the lurid side and with the Nazi menace motif of familiar timber, shortcomings are compensated for by fast-moving continuity which smartly builds suspense and hold (sic) attention." By December 31, Variety had changed its tune: “Chase and gunbattle in Central Park, scraps in the warehouse district, the mystery girl in distress, emphasis on danger to American institutions from foreign conspirators add up to elementary but surefire audience appeal.”

Film Daily called it a "fast-moving and exciting melodrama." Russell Maloney of The New Yorker panned the film, writing that "Hitchcock himself couldn't have asked for a better plot," but claiming that it was brought down by "the feebleness of invention, the wordiness of the dialogue, [and] the sluggishly paced direction."

Box office
According to Warner Bros records the film earned $1,009,000 domestically and $959,000 foreign during its initial run.

Variety estimated the film had earned $1.1 million domestically by the end of 1942.

See also
America First Committee

References

External links

 

1940s spy thriller films
1942 films
American black-and-white films
American spy thriller films
Films scored by Adolph Deutsch
Films directed by Vincent Sherman
Films set in New York City
Films set on the home front during World War II
American gangster films
Warner Bros. films
World War II films made in wartime
World War II spy films
1940s English-language films